Tauroscopa trapezitis is a moth in the family Crambidae. It was described by Edward Meyrick in 1905. It is endemic to New Zealand.

References

Crambinae
Moths described in 1905
Moths of New Zealand
Endemic fauna of New Zealand
Taxa named by Edward Meyrick
Endemic moths of New Zealand